Universal Avenue is a global on demand sales platform headquartered in Stockholm, Sweden. It was founded in 2014 with investment from the company behind the Angry Birds game.
The company has to date raised $17m in total capital, most recently a $10m Series A investment in 2016 from London's Eight Roads Ventures.

In 2018, Universal Avenue has acquired Swedish digital agency Varvet. The deal is a strategic move aimed at improving Universal Avenue's technical platform. Universal Avenue also raised €5.3 million in Series B funding through convertible bonds from MOOR Capital.

References

External links
 

Companies based in Stockholm
Swedish brands
Online retailers of Sweden